Escoma is a location in the La Paz Department in Bolivia. It is the seat of the Escoma Municipality,  one of five municipalities of the Eliodoro Camacho Province. In 2009 Escoma had an estimated population of 712.

References

Populated places in La Paz Department (Bolivia)